Project Lyra is a feasibility study of a mission to interstellar objects such as ʻOumuamua and 2I/Borisov, initiated on 30 October 2017 by the Initiative for Interstellar Studies (i4is). In January 2022, researchers proposed that a spacecraft launched from Earth could catch up to 'Oumuamua in 26 years for further close-up studies.

Overview
The suggested options for sending a spacecraft to ʻOumuamua within a time-frame of 5 to 10 years are based on using first a Jupiter flyby, followed by a close solar flyby at 3 to 10 solar radii, in order to take advantage of the Oberth effect; or, more advanced options such as a solar sail, laser sail, or nuclear propulsion.

Detail
ʻOumuamua was at first thought to be traveling too fast for any existing spacecraft to reach.

The Initiative for Interstellar Studies (i4is) launched Project Lyra to assess the feasibility of a mission to ʻOumuamua. Several options for sending a spacecraft to ʻOumuamua within a time-frame of 5 to 25 years were suggested.

The challenge is to get to the asteroid in a reasonable amount of time (and so at a reasonable distance from Earth), and yet be able to gain useful scientific information. To do this, decelerating the spacecraft at ʻOumuamua would be "highly desirable, due to the minimal science return from a hyper-velocity encounter". If the investigative craft goes too fast, it would not be able to get into orbit or land on the asteroid, and would fly past it. The authors conclude that, although challenging, an encounter mission would be feasible using near-term technology. Seligman and Laughlin adopt a complementary approach to the Lyra study, but also conclude that such missions, though challenging to mount, are both feasible and scientifically attractive.

Different mission durations and their velocity requirements were explored with respect to the launch date, assuming direct impulsive transfer to the intercept trajectory. A spacecraft with a mass of tens of kilograms, using a heat shield like that in the Parker Solar Probe, and a Falcon Heavy-class launcher with a trajectory including a powered Jupiter flyby, and a solar Oberth maneuver, was calculated to be able to reach ʻOumuamua, had it been launched in 2021. More advanced options such as solar, laser electric propulsion, laser sail propulsion based on Breakthrough Starshot technology, and nuclear propulsion have also been considered.

References 

Spaceflight concepts
Proposed space probes
Hyperbolic asteroids
Interstellar travel